Çınarpınar can refer to:

 Çınarpınar, Ayvacık
 Çınarpınar, Gönen